VIXX LR is the first official sub-unit of South Korean boy band VIXX formed by Jellyfish Entertainment. Established in August 2015, VIXX LR consists of VIXX vocalist Leo and rapper Ravi. The duo debuted with their first mini album, Beautiful Liar, on August 17, 2015.

Name
VIXX LR is a combination of VIXX ( pronounced "vicks"; acronym for voice, visual, value in excelsis) and the initials of the members stage names, "L" for Leo and "R" for  Ravi. At their debut showcase, Leo further explained that the name also stands for "left" and "right", in reference to their contrasting qualities and images that create harmony when they perform together. Ravi gave an additional, more literal interpretation, saying it correlates to their positions while standing on stage from the audience's point of view. The letters "L" and "R" also represent the first and last letters in the word "liar" from the title of their debut EP, Beautiful Liar, and its lead single of the same name.

History
On August 7, 2015, Jellyfish Entertainment released a video trailer on VIXX's official website after a mysterious countdown with a silhouette of the group's last special album Boys' Record. As time went by, the band members disappeared one by one, until only Leo and Ravi remained, raising speculation that another comeback for the group was imminent. A video trailer for VIXX LR was then revealed. Jellyfish confirmed that VIXX LR would be VIXX's first official sub-unit, comprising rapper Ravi and vocalist Leo.

VIXX LR released their debut mini album, Beautiful Liar, on August 17, 2015, and held their first promotional showcase at Yes24 Muv Hall in Hongdae, Mapo-gu, Seoul that same day. They began music show activities on August 18, with a special stage performance of their debut single "Beautiful Liar"on SBS MTV's The Show. The duo debuted on the Billboard World Albums chart and the South Korean Gaon Album Chart at number two. On September 1, they earned their first music show win on SBS MTV's The Show, with 9,464 votes, the second-highest all-time score in the program's history, only behind parent group VIXX's "Error". On September 4, 2015, VIXX LR wrapped up their three week promotional cycle for Beautiful Liar on KBS2's Music Bank with a goodbye stage performance.

"Beautiful Liar" was nominated for two awards at the 2015 Mnet Asian Music Awards for Best Collaboration and Unit and Song of the Year. In January 2016 VIXX LR held showcase performances in Nagoya, Tokyo and Osaka as part of their first live showcase tour Beautiful Liar in Japan.

On July 19, 2017, Jellyfish Entertainment announced that VIXX LR is aiming to make a comeback and release a new album in August.  On August 14, VIXX LR announced that their second mini album Whisper would be released on August 28, 2017.

VIXX LR announced their first concert tour, Eclipse, in October 2017. The first two shows, collectively titled Eclipse in Seoul, were held on November 18 and 19 at the Olympic Hall in Seoul. On January 24, 2018, VIXX LR released their first compilation album, Complete LR, in Japan. The album contained all tracks from both of their previously released mini-albums, plus two new songs, one of which was a Japanese version of "Whisper". The duo held the final three shows of the Eclipse tour in Tokyo, on January 25, and Osaka, on January 27 and 28 respectively.

Discography

Extended plays

Compilation albums

Singles

Other charted songs

Music videos

Concerts

2015: VIXX LR Beautiful Liar Showcase
2016: VIXX LR 1st LIVE SHOWCASE TOUR Beautiful Liar in Japan
2017: VIXX LR 1st Concert Eclipse in Seoul, Tokyo and Osaka
2018: VIXX LR Eclipse in Europe

Achievements

Awards and nominations

Notes

References

External links

 VIXX at Jellyfish Entertainment 
 VIXX Japan Official Site 

VIXX
Jellyfish Entertainment artists
CJ Victor Entertainment artists
K-pop music groups
Musical groups established in 2015
South Korean musical duos
South Korean boy bands
South Korean pop music groups
South Korean dance music groups
Musical groups from Seoul
2015 establishments in South Korea